The 2010 FIRA tournament included all the continent's major teams who did not qualify for the World Cup, plus Sweden (who did qualify) and a France "A" team. Prior to the tournament Jean-Claude Baqué, Chairman of the FIRA-AER, explained the philosophy of the European Trophy.
"The European Trophy is an important tournament for the development of women 15's rugby within Europe. The European Championship takes place each four years (Note: next edition in 2012) but the FIRA-AER must propose games to emerging unions through a serious competition and with the help of the big nations"
Unusually, and for no published reason, all games were only 35 minutes per half.

Pool A

Results

Pool B

Results

7th place

5th place

3rd place

Final

Point scorers

Leading point scorers

Other point scorers
14 points: Marina Bravo (Spain)
10 points: Ana María Aigneren (Spain), Joyce van Altena (Netherlands), Lía Bailán (Spain), Lusan Beijens (Netherlands), Nadège Casenave (France A), Chiara Castellarin (Italy), Koumiba Djossouvi (France A), Dorien Eppink (Netherlands), Camille Grassineau (France A), Jennifer Lindholm (Sweden), Cyndia Mansard (France A), Elizabeth Martínez (Spain), Alexandra Pertus (France A), Bárbara Pla (Spain), Sandra Rabier (France A), Pien Selbeck (Netherlands), Tatiana Sokolova (Russia), Maike Tetz (Germany)
9 points: Lina Norman (Sweden)
8 points: Michela Tondinelli (Italy)
5 points: Sara Åkerman (Sweden), Sylvie Bernard (France A), Hayate Chrouky (France A), Maria Grazia Cioffi (Italy), Elisa Cucchiella (Italy), Cathy de Geyther (Belgium), Ángela Del Pan (Spain), Ninja Duri (Germany), Clarisse Fell (France A), Berta García (Spain), Patricia García (Spain), Anne Hielckert (Netherlands), Henriette Högberg (Sweden), Ninni Giebat Johansson (Sweden), Anna Larsson (Sweden), Lisa Maral (Germany), Jennie Öhman (Sweden), Elisabeth Österberg (Sweden), Jaqueline Peisker (Germany), Julia Pla (Spain), Anna Rambaud (France A), Germana Raponi (Italy), Vanessa Rial (Spain), Elisa Rochas (Italy), García Rocío (Spain), Frida Ryberg (Sweden), Claudia Tedeschi (Italy), Sofia Torstensson (Sweden), Inge Visser (Netherlands), Rita Wiri (Netherlands), Nadezda Yarmotskaya (Russia)
2 points: Natalia Alexeeva (Russia)

See also
Women's international rugby union

Notes

External links
FIRA website
FIRA's page on the tournament

2010
2010 rugby union tournaments for national teams
International women's rugby union competitions hosted by France
2009–10 in European women's rugby union
2009–10 in French rugby union
2010 in French women's sport